Lion is a sculpture by Roland Hinton Perry, installed in San Francisco's Golden Gate Park, in the U.S. state of California.

External links
 

Animal sculptures in California
Golden Gate Park
Outdoor sculptures in San Francisco
Sculptures by Roland Hinton Perry
Sculptures of lions
Statues in California